"Everybody Needs Love" is a song by American singer-songwriter Stephen Bishop. The song was the first of two singles from his second album, Bish, the other being "Looking for the Right One".

"Everybody Needs Love" peaked at number 32 on the U.S. Billboard Hot 100 and number 29 on the Cash Box Top 100.  In Canada, the song peaked at number 29.

The song was a much bigger Adult Contemporary hit, peaking at number five in the U.S. and number two in Canada.

Personnel 
 Stephen Bishop – lead and backing vocals, acoustic guitar
 John Barlow Jarvis – acoustic piano
 Greg Phillinganes – electric piano, synthesizers 
 Ray Parker Jr. – guitar
 Michael Sembello – guitar
 Nathan Watts – bass
 Raymond Pounds – drums
 Paulinho da Costa – percussion
 Leah Kunkel – backing vocals
 Michael Staton – backing vocals
 Jeffrey Staton – backing vocals

Chart performance

Weekly charts

Year-end charts

References

External links
 

1978 songs
1978 singles
Stephen Bishop (singer) songs
ABC Records singles
Songs written by Stephen Bishop (singer)